Tangled is a 2010 American 3D computer-animated musical adventure fantasy comedy film produced by Walt Disney Animation Studios and released by Walt Disney Pictures. Loosely based on the German fairy tale Rapunzel in the collection of folk tales published by the Brothers Grimm, it is the 50th Disney animated feature film. The film was directed by Nathan Greno and Byron Howard (in the former's feature directorial debut) and produced by Roy Conli, from a screenplay written by Dan Fogelman. Featuring the voices of Mandy Moore, Zachary Levi, and Donna Murphy, Tangled tells the story of Rapunzel, a lost young princess with magical long blonde hair who yearns to leave her secluded tower. She accepts the aid of an intruder to take her out into the world which she has never seen.

Originally conceived and proposed by Disney animator Glen Keane in 2001, Tangled spent six years in production at a cost that has been estimated at $260 million, which, if accurate, would make it the most expensive animated film ever made and one of the most expensive films of all time. The film employed a unique artistic style by blending together features of computer-generated imagery (CGI) and traditional animation while using non-photorealistic rendering to create the impression of a painting. Composer Alan Menken, who had worked on prior Disney animated features, returned to score Tangled, and also wrote the film's songs with lyricist Glenn Slater. Before the film's release, its title was changed from Rapunzel to Tangled, reportedly to market the film gender-neutrally.

Tangled premiered at the El Capitan Theatre in Los Angeles on November 14, 2010, and went into general release on November 24. The film earned $592 million in worldwide box office revenue, $200 million of which was earned in the United States and Canada, making it the eighth highest-grossing film of 2010, and was praised by critics for its animation, writing, characters, and musical score. The film was nominated for a number of awards, including Best Original Song at the 83rd Academy Awards. The film was released on Blu-ray and DVD on March 29, 2011; a short film, Tangled Ever After, was released later in 2012 and a television series premiered in 2017.

Plot

Long ago, a drop of magical sunlight fell from the sky and sprouted a flower with healing powers. Upon discovering it, an old beggar woman named Mother Gothel hid the flower and used it to stay young for centuries, until royal soldiers from the nearby kingdom of Corona found and uprooted it to save their pregnant and ill Queen. The Queen gave birth to a baby princess with long golden hair, but while the king and queen were sleeping one evening, Gothel discovered the hair has the same powers as the flower, but it turns brown and becomes powerless when cut. She kidnapped the girl, named Rapunzel, and raises her in a hidden tower in the woods, using her hair to stay young.

Each year, on Rapunzel's birthday, the king and queen release sky lanterns in hope she will see them and return home. Rapunzel becomes obsessed with the distant lights and the colour pink, and, on the eve of her 18th birthday, asks Gothel for permission to see them closer. Gothel refuses, claiming that the outside world is dangerous and Rapunzel is too weak and young to survive in it. Later, handsome thief Flynn Rider steals Rapunzel's intended crown from the palace, abandons his partners, the Stabbington brothers, and takes refuge in the tower. Rapunzel knocks him out with a frying pan, and hides him in a closet. She tries to show him to Gothel as proof she is capable of taking care of herself; however, Gothel still refuses, so Rapunzel sends Gothel on a three-day journey to get new paints as a birthday gift.

Rapunzel hides the crown and tells Flynn he can only get it back by taking her to see the lights. He agrees, and the two set off to see the lights. Along the way, they stop at the Snuggly Duckling pub, where menacing thugs try to capture the wanted Flynn, But Rapunzel soon charms them into revealing their softer sides. When royal guards arrive, the thugs help her and Flynn escape. Meanwhile, Gothel becomes suspicious, returns to the empty tower, and finds the crown. She sets out to find Rapunzel and allies with the Stabbington brothers.

In escaping from the guards, Flynn and Rapunzel become trapped in a fast-flooding cave. Believing they will die, Flynn resignedly reveals his true name, Eugene Fitzherbert, and Rapunzel reveals her magic powers. Her glowing hair shows a previously hidden exit, and they escape and take refuge in the woods, where Eugene reveals his upbringing as an orphan. That night, Gothel catches up to Rapunzel while Eugene is away, gives her the crown, and tells her to use it to test Eugene's loyalty.

The next morning, a palace horse named Maximus tracks down Eugene. Rapunzel demands a truce in honor of her birthday, and Maximus reluctantly agrees, joining them as they enter the kingdom and attend a festival in honor of the "lost princess". They spend the day celebrating with the townsfolk, then sail onto the lake to watch the release of the lanterns. Having fulfilled her dream, Rapunzel gives Eugene back the crown, and the two confess their love. When Eugene sees the Stabbington brothers on the shore, he walks off to apologize, and offers them the crown, but they abduct him, tying him to a ship with the crown so the royal guards will arrest him and Rapunzel will think he abandoned her. They then try to capture Rapunzel, but Gothel stages a "rescue" by knocking the brothers unconscious, and takes Rapunzel home.

Eugene escapes with the help of Maximus and the pub thugs. Meanwhile, Rapunzel realizes she has subconsciously incorporated the kingdom's standard into her artwork all her life. Finally understanding that she is the "lost princess", she confronts Gothel. Eugene arrives at the tower, and her hair is thrown down to him. Upon climbing up, however, he finds she has been bound and gagged, and Gothel fatally stabs him from behind. She tries to drag Rapunzel to a new hiding place. Rapunzel offers to go willingly, if Gothel will allow her to heal Eugene. Gothel reluctantly agrees, but Eugene, realizing Rapunzel would be spending the rest of her life in Gothel's captivity, cuts off her hair before she can heal him. Gothel begins to age rapidly and turns to dust as she falls out of the tower.

Rapunzel mourns the loss of Eugene, and one of her tears, still having some of the sun's power, brings him back to life. Eugene reunites Rapunzel with her real parents, is fully pardoned for his crimes, and he and Rapunzel are married as the kingdom celebrates.

Voice cast

 Mandy Moore – Rapunzel
 Delaney Rose Stein – young Rapunzel
 Zachary Levi – Flynn Rider/Eugene Fitzherbert
 Donna Murphy – Mother Gothel
 Brad Garrett – Hook Hand Thug
 Ron Perlman – Stabbington brother
 Jeffrey Tambor – Big Nose Thug
 Richard Kiel – Vlad
 M. C. Gainey – Captain of the Guard
 Paul F. Tompkins – Short Thug

Non-speaking animal characters include Rapunzel's pet chameleon Pascal, and Maximus, the horse of the head of the palace guard. Other non-speaking roles include Rapunzel's parents (the King and Queen of Corona), the other Stabbington brother, and Ulf the Mime Thug.

Production

Origins and conception
The concept of an animated film based on the Brothers Grimm fairy tale Rapunzel originated from Disney supervising animator Glen Keane in 1996. In 2001, Keane pitched the idea to then-Disney CEO Michael Eisner who approved it, but requested the film to be computer-animated. However, Keane was hesitant as he felt computer animation was not quite as fluid or organic as traditional animation was. In October 2003, the film was announced as Rapunzel Unbraided as a computer animated feature scheduled for a 2007 release, which Keane described as "a Shrek-like version of the film". According to Ed Catmull, Eisner himself had proposed using modern-day San Francisco as the initial setting of the film. The story initially centered on two teenagers, Claire and Vince, who live in San Francisco and are transported into the fairy tale world, where they inhabit the bodies of Rapunzel and her prince Beau. Rapunzel and Beau themselves are turned into a squirrel and a dog. In July 2004, Reese Witherspoon and Kristin Chenoweth were in talks to portray roles, with the latter intended to voice Rapunzel. In October 2005, Dan Fogler was slated to provide a voice.

In reflection, Keane said of the original plot, "It was a fun, wonderful, witty version and we had a couple of great writers. But in my heart of hearts I believed there was something much more sincere and genuine to get out of the story, so we set it aside and went back to the roots of the original fairy tale." In November 2005, Unbraided was pushed back to a summer 2009 release in order to give Keane "more time to work on the story." In January 2006, the film was then shut down about a week before Catmull and John Lasseter were placed in charge of the studio, and one of their first decisions was to restart the project and ask Keane to keep going with the film. It had originally been announced in April 2007 that Annie-nominated animator and story artist Dean Wellins would be co-directing the film alongside Keane. 

On October 9, 2008, it was reported that Keane and Wellins had stepped down as directors due to other commitments, and were replaced by the team of Byron Howard and Nathan Greno, director and storyboard director, respectively, of Disney's 2008 animated feature Bolt. Keane stayed on as an executive producer and animation supervisor, while Wellins moved on to developing other short and feature films. After the film's release, Keane revealed that he had "stepped back" from the role of director because of a heart attack in 2008.

Casting
On September 10, 2009, it was announced that actress and singer-songwriter Mandy Moore, who previously worked with Disney on Disneytoon Studios' Brother Bear 2, had been cast as the voice of Rapunzel, and actor Zachary Levi would provide the voice of Flynn Rider. For the role of Flynn, the studio mandated exclusively only UK actors to audition for the part, as Ryder was intended to be British. An American, Zachary Levi, impersonated a British Received Pronunciation (RP) accent to audition, leading the producers to opt for him to use his natural American accent. Mandy Moore approached the project through auditioning, when she heard that a film about the story of Rapunzel was being made. Moore later expressed that she had dreamed to be a Disney princess since she was young and said that with the role of Rapunzel, she had fulfilled her "ultimate childhood dream". She described herself as a "girly fan" of Disney animated films like The Little Mermaid, Beauty and the Beast, Aladdin and The Lion King, and that it was an honor for her to be part of this "legacy"—the lineage of such Disney icons. Since the film was going to be a musical, it was required that all auditionees had to read several scenes and perform a song of their choice, to ensure that the voice actors could both act and sing. For this singing section, Moore chose "Help Me" by Joni Mitchell, a song that she herself had covered on her fourth studio album, Coverage (2003). Moore revealed that she had to attend several audition sessions and described the experiences as "pretty fun" but didn't put much hope in getting the part because she believed there would be much competition for this role; she just performed her best without any anxiety. When she received a callback from Disney telling that she got the part, Moore described herself as being "over the moon": "I was working in New York at the time. I was with some friends and my husband—and I screamed as soon as I found out the news."

The film reportedly cost more than $260 million to produce.

Writing and character development
When asked about the character of Rapunzel, Mandy Moore said that Rapunzel was a relatable character and called her a "Renaissance, bohemian" woman rather than a typical Disney princess: Moore said "[Rapunzel] doesn't know she's a princess [until the end of the film]. She's just really sort of motivated to find out what else is out there beyond this crazy tower she's lived in for 18 years," and that "she's very independent, she can take care of herself, and she's definitely come up with really entertaining ways to keep herself busy." Moore also stated that she herself had little influence on Rapunzel: "The character was developed way before I had anything to do with it."

According to Greno, one of the most difficult problems during the development of the film's plot was how to get Rapunzel out of the tower without immediately ending the movie, in that she had thereby escaped Mother Gothel and did not have any other specific objectives to pursue. At a meeting one day, animator John Ripa floated an idea which turned out to be the solution they had been looking for: the mysterious floating lanterns.

Recording
In Tangled, as with most animated films, all voice actors had to record their dialogue separately from one another to avoid bleeding into each other's tracks. Mandy Moore later recalled that during recording, she had never met Donna Murphy and only met Zachary Levi once when they recorded "I See the Light". Moore thought that this was "a good exercise in employing your imagination". When recording action scenes, the voice actors had to jog a little in place in order to make their voices sound realistic. For the songs, Moore and Levi recorded on a soundstage with a 65-piece orchestra under the supervision of composer Alan Menken. They sang live with the orchestra for several times in order to help everyone "get a vibe" and a feel for the music and the singing, then were asked to go in isolation booths to record the actual tracks. In order to aid animators in animating the characters, the filmmakers did interviews with the voice actors and filmed their facial expressions throughout the recording sessions. Disney animated films are usually animated to synchronize with recorded dialogue rather than asking the vocal talent to synchronize their delivery to animation after it is rendered. Thus, Moore felt that the recording process was challenging because at that time she had no animation to look at except for a few sketches.

Due to scheduling conflicts with other projects (Moore had to travel to different places such as London or New York, and Levi could only record on weekends for five hours once every six weeks), they did not record dialogue in the same order as in the final film. "[When I came in], maybe that sequence or scene had been recorded by Mandy (Moore) already, maybe it hadn't. We'd end up doing the same scene five times, depending," Levi said. After watching the finished film, Moore was disappointed because she felt that her voice sounded "shrill", while Levi thought that his performance sounded "incredibly nasally".

Animation

The film was made using computer-generated imagery (CGI), although Tangled was modeled on the traditional look of oil paintings on canvas. The Rococo paintings of French artist Jean-Honoré Fragonard, particularly The Swing, were used as references for the film's artistic style, a style described by Keane as "romantic and lush." To create the impression of a painting, non-photorealistic rendering was used.

Glen Keane originally wanted the film to be animated using a traditional 2D animation process. However, Disney executives David Stainton and Dick Cook announced that they would only approve the film for production if it were created using the 3D computer graphics. In response to that demand, Glen Keane held a seminar called "The Best of Both Worlds", where he, with 50 Disney CGI artists and traditional artists, focused on the pros and cons of each style. After the meeting, it was decided that the film would be made in 3D CGI animation, but in a way as to become an extension of the traditional 2D Disney "aesthetic", a term which referred to the naturalistic animation that conforms to the fundamental principles of animation as documented by Frank Thomas and Ollie Johnston in the book The Illusion of Life: Disney Animation.

Due to limitations in computer technology, especially regarding attempts to capture the complexity of a human form, many basic principles of animation used in traditionally animated movies had been absent from earlier CGI films; but technological advancements made it easier to blend the two, combining the strengths of each style. Keane stated repeatedly he was trying to make the computer "bend its knee to the artist" instead of having the computer dictate the artistic style and look of the film. By making the computer become as "pliable as the pencil", Keane's vision of a "three-dimensional drawing" seemed within reach, with the artist controlling the technology. Many of the techniques and tools that were required to give the film the quality Keane demanded did not exist when the project was started, and Walt Disney Animation Studios had to create them on their own. Keane said, "There’s no photoreal hair. I want luscious hair, and we are inventing new ways of doing that. I want to bring the warmth and intuitive feel of hand-drawn to CGI."

One of the main goals of the animators was to create movement that mimicked the soft fluidity of the hand-drawn art found in older Disney animated films. Keane credited Disney 3D animator Kyle Strawitz with helping to combine CGI with the traditional hand-drawn style. "He took the house from Snow White and built it and painted it so it looked like a flat painting that suddenly started to move, and it had dimension and kept all of the soft, round curves of the brushstrokes of watercolor. Kyle helped us get that Fragonard look of that girl on the swing… We are using subsurface scattering and global illumination and all of the latest techniques to pull off convincing human characters and rich environments."

Rather than focusing on realism, the 3D team used an aesthetic approach. Robert Newman, the film’s stereoscopic supervisor said that "We’re using depth more artistically than ever before, and we’re not as concerned with the literal transcription of depth between camera and projector as we are the interpretation of it." To do this, they used a new technique called multi-rigging, which is made up of multiple pairs of virtual cameras. Each pair is used individually on each separate element that adds depth to a scene, like background, foreground, and characters, without adjusting for the relation with the other pairs. When sandwiched together later in production, the result was something that would be visually impossible in the real world, but which created an appealing look to the film.

As a counterpart to the appealing and cute design of Rapunzel, the directors wanted to make Flynn Rider "the most handsome, most attractive male lead Disney has ever had." They held a large "Hot Man Meeting" where they gathered about 30 women from the studio and asked them what they considered attractive in a man. They brought in hundreds of images of their favourite male actors and celebrities, which were torn and pasted back again. After much deliberation, his look was eventually narrowed down to one concept drawing.

Technology development
Existing technology continued to present difficulties: in particular, animating hair turned out to be a challenge. Senior software engineer Kelly Ward spent six years writing programs to make it move the way they wanted. As late as January 2010, the directors were still not sure if the Rapunzel character's length of hair was going to work. These problems were finally solved in March: An improved version of a hair simulation program named Dynamic Wires, originally developed for Bolt, was eventually used. To make hair float believably in water, and to surmount other similar challenges, discrete differential geometry was used to produce the desired effects, freeing the animators from executing these specific tasks directly, which would have taken days instead of minutes.

Controversy over the film title change

When first put into production, the film was promoted as having the title Rapunzel Unbraided, which was later changed to Rapunzel. Disney's previous animated feature, The Princess and the Frog (2009)—while being well-received by various critics  and taking in nearly $270 million worldwide—was not as successful as Disney had hoped, and Catmull later admitted in writing that Disney Animation's faith that The Princess and the Frogs excellent quality would bring in all audiences notwithstanding the word "princess" in the title was their version of "a stupid pill". In order to market the new film to both sexes and additional age groups, Disney changed the title from Rapunzel to Tangled while also emphasizing Flynn Rider, the film's prominent male character, showing that his story is just as important as that of Rapunzel. Disney was criticized for altering the title as a marketing strategy. Floyd Norman, a former Disney and Pixar animator and story artist, said, "The idea of changing the title of a classic like Rapunzel to Tangled is beyond stupid. I'm convinced they'll gain nothing from this except the public seeing Disney as desperately trying to find an audience."

Justin Chang of Variety compared it to changing the title of The Little Mermaid to Beached. Writing for the San Francisco Chronicles blog, Margot Magowan accused Disney of sexism, writing:

On November 24, 2010, the day of the film's release, directors Nathan Greno and Byron Howard disputed reports that the title change was a marketing decision. They said they changed the title from Rapunzel to Tangled because Rapunzel is not the only main character in the film. They went on to say that you cannot call Toy Story "Buzz Lightyear," and they really needed a title that represented what the film is, and that it stars the duo of Rapunzel and Flynn Rider.

In March 2014, executive producer John Lasseter explained that Disney had changed the name to improve the film's appeal to the four quadrants: "There was an audience perception that these movies were just for little girls but when boys, men, whatever actually see these movies they like them. So on Rapunzel … we changed the name and we called it Tangled. We did marketing that made the people who would not normally show up say, 'Hey, this looks pretty good.'"

Music

The musical score and soundtrack album were composed by Alan Menken with lyrics written by Glenn Slater. It marked Menken's return to scoring for animated films, after recurringly doing so for several Disney Animation films till Home on the Range (2004). As several Pixar employees, being in-charge for Disney, and the sensibilities being changed, Menken thought it as his biggest creative challenge and said that, he was "finding a way that we could wed musical-theater storytelling with the Pixar style of storytelling was primary". Menken said he attempted to blend medieval music with 1960s folk rock to create the new songs and the score and soundtrack were recorded at a span of two-and-a-half years.

Several songs were written, but eventually cut from the final film; "When Will My Life Begin?" replaced an earlier version called "What More Could I Ever Need?". Menken reported that that opening number went through five or six different versions. Elsewhere, Menken reported that there was originally a love song called "You Are My Forever" that Mother Gothel sang to Rapunzel in a motherly way, but was reprised later in the film by Flynn Rider in a romantic way. This idea was apparently replaced with the two songs "Mother Knows Best" and "I See the Light". The song "Something That I Want" written and performed by Grace Potter from Grace Potter and the Nocturnals is featured in the closing credits. The Latin American Spanish version of the song, titled "Algo quiero querer", was recorded by Colombian pop-singer, Fanny Lú.

The soundtrack, released on Walt Disney Records on November 10, 2010, and peaked at number 44 on the Billboard 200, number 7 on the Soundtrack chart, and number 3 on the Kid Albums chart. Four years later, a double LP picture disc titled as Songs from Tangled was released on March 21, 2014.

Release

Theatrical
Tangled premiered in Paris on November 17, exclusively screening at the Grand Rex theater two weeks in advance of its French wide release. With over 3,800 tickets sold on its opening day, it set a new record for films showing in a single theater.

Home media
Tangled was released by Walt Disney Studios Home Entertainment as a four-disc combo pack on March 29, 2011. The combo pack includes a Blu-ray 3D, standard Blu-ray, DVD, and digital copy. A two-disc Blu-ray/DVD combo pack and single DVD are also available. Bonus features for the Blu-ray include deleted scenes, two alternate opening sequences, two extended songs, and an inside look at how the film was made. The DVD includes only the two Original Storybook Openings and the 50th Animated Feature Countdown.

Sales of Tangled in the US and Canada exceeded $95 million in DVD and Blu-ray sales, the highest-grossing DVD of the year 2011; its home video sales exceeded the film's earnings in its first week in theaters. The film sold a record 2,970,052 units (the equivalent of $44,521,079) in its first week in North America, the largest opening for a 2011 DVD. It dominated for two weeks on the DVD sales chart and sold 6,657,331 units ($102,154,692) as of July 18, 2012. It has also sold 2,518,522 Blu-ray units ($59,220,275) by May 29, 2011. As of January 20, 2016, the film has earned a total of $215 million in home video sales in the United States and Canada ($155 million from DVD sales and $60 million from Blu-ray sales). Tangled was released on Ultra HD Blu-ray on November 5, 2019.

Reception

Box office
Tangled had a worldwide opening weekend of $86.1 million, and reached the summit of the worldwide box office once, on its eleventh weekend (Feb 4–6, 2011), with $24.9 million. The film earned $200.8 million in North America, and $391.6 million in other countries, for a worldwide total of $592.5 million; making it the third highest-grossing animated film of 2010, behind Shrek Forever After and Toy Story 3, and the eighth highest-grossing film of 2010. It was the third Disney film appearing in the Top 10 films of 2010. As of 2017, it was the sixth-highest-grossing film worldwide produced by Walt Disney Animation Studios, behind Frozen, Zootopia, The Lion King, Big Hero 6, and Moana.

Tangled earned $11.9 million on its opening Wednesday, breaking the record for the largest pre-Thanksgiving Wednesday opening, a record previously held by Disney·Pixar's Toy Story 2. In its first weekend of release, it earned $48.8 million (the highest opening for Walt Disney Animation Studios, surpassing The Lion King ($40.9 million), and later surpassed by both Wreck-It Ralph ($49 million) and Frozen ($67.4 million)), placing second for the period behind Harry Potter and the Deathly Hallows – Part 1, which earned $49.1 million. Tangled had the sixth-highest opening weekend for a film that did not debut at #1. Over the traditional Wednesday–Sunday Thanksgiving holiday period, it tallied $68.7 million, again finishing in second place. Tangled also marked the second-largest 3-day and 5-day Thanksgiving opening after Toy Story 2. During its second weekend (post-Thanksgiving), Tangled declined 56% to $21.6 million, although it jumped to first place at the box office. With a final gross of $200.8 million, it is the tenth-highest-grossing film of 2010, and the tenth 2010 film to pass the $200 million mark; it was the fourth-slowest film to pass this mark. Unadjusted for inflation, it is the ninth-highest-grossing film produced by Walt Disney Animation Studios, behind The Lion King ($422.8 million), Frozen ($400.7 million), Zootopia ($341.3 million), Moana ($248.7 million), Big Hero 6 ($221.3 million), Beauty and the Beast ($219 million), Aladdin ($217.4 million), and Ralph Breaks the Internet ($201.1 million).

On its opening weekend, it earned $17.4 million in eight territories and ranked second for the weekend behind Harry Potter and the Deathly Hallows – Part 1 ($117.3 million). It reached first place at the weekend box office outside North America three times in 2011. It marked the seventh-highest-grossing 2010 film and the third-highest-grossing 2010 animated film. In Russia and the CIS, it set an opening-weekend record among non-sequel animated films (first surpassed by Rio) and among Walt Disney Animation Studios films (surpassed by Frozen). Its highest-grossing markets outside North America was Germany ($44.2 million), where it is the highest-grossing 2010 animated film, followed by France and the Maghreb region ($39.4 million) and the UK, Ireland and Malta ($32.9 million).

Critical response
The website's critical consensus is: "While far from Disney's greatest film, Tangled is a visually stunning, thoroughly entertaining addition to the studio's classic animated canon." Metacritic, which assigns a weighted average score based on reviews from mainstream film critics, calculated a score of 71/100 based on 34 reviews, indicating "generally favorable reviews". Audiences polled by CinemaScore during the opening weekend, gave the film an average grade "A+" on an A+ to F scale.

A. O. Scott of The New York Times positively reviewed the film as "the 50th animated feature from Disney, and its look and spirit convey a modified, updated but nonetheless sincere and unmistakable quality of old-fashioned Disneyness." Time film critic Richard Corliss wrote that Tangled "wades into the DreamWorks style of sitcom gags and anachronistic sass," while praising the film for achieving "the complex mix of romance, comedy, adventure and heart that defines the best Disney features." Corliss included Tangled at 19 in a list of top 25 All-time Best Animated films. Kenneth Turan from the Los Angeles Times awarded the film four stars out of five; he described the film as a "gorgeous computer-animated look that features rich landscapes and characters that look fuller and more lifelike than they have in the past." Sandie Angulo Chen of Common Sense Media gave the film five out of five stars, writing, "Fantastic princess adventure is fun, with great messages." Gael Cooper of NBC News expressed that Tangled may be the best Disney film of all time.

James Berardinelli commented on his review website ReelViews that the film is "entertaining and enjoyable, but not groundbreaking." He also stated Rapunzel is "not as memorable as Snow White, Ariel, or Belle" as well as stating "the songs are neither catchy nor memorable." Todd McCarthy, film reviewer for The Hollywood Reporter opened his review with, "It would have been nice if Disney's self-touted 50th animated feature were one of its best, a film that could stand with the studio's classics, but the world will have to make do with Tangled, a passably entertaining hodgepodge of old and new animation techniques, mixed sensibilities and hedged commercial calculations."

Accolades
The film has been nominated for a number of awards. Hollywood Foreign Press Association nominated Tangled for two Golden Globe Awards, for Best Animated Feature Film and Best Original Song for "I See the Light", but lost to Toy Story 3 and Burlesque, respectively. The film also received two nominations for the Broadcast Film Critics Association in the same categories, though lost to Toy Story 3 and 127 Hours, as well as nominations for two Annie Awards, for Best Animated Feature Film and for Writing in a Feature Production.

Tangled was also nominated for two Phoenix Film Critics Society Awards, Best Animated Film and Best Original Song for "I've Got a Dream," which it lost to Toy Story 3 and Burlesque. "I See the Light" was nominated for Best Original Song at the 83rd Academy Awards, but lost to "We Belong Together" from Toy Story 3. It has also been nominated for 37th Saturn Award for Best Animated Film.

Tangled won best 3D scene of the year at the second annual International 3D Society Creative Arts Awards.

Tangled was also nominated for favorite film in the British Academy Children Awards for Favorite Film, competing against films like Harry Potter and the Deathly Hallows – Parts 1 & 2, Transformers: Dark of the Moon, Cars 2, and Kung Fu Panda 2.

Video games

A video game based on the film was released on November 23, 2010, for Nintendo DS, Wii, and PC platforms by Disney Interactive Studios.

A world based on the film, Kingdom of Corona, appears in Kingdom Hearts III, released on January 29, 2019 (US) for PlayStation 4 and Xbox One. The game takes place during the events of the movie.

In the video game Disney Magic Kingdoms, Rapunzel, Flynn, Maximus, Mother Gothel and Pascal are playable characters, while Rapunzel's Tower and Snuggly Duckling appear as attractions. The storyline of the characters in the game follows almost the same plot as in the film.

Rapunzel, Flynn Rider, Maximus, and Mother Gothel are all playable heroes in Disney Heroes: Battle Mode. The Stabbington brothers also appear in Mother Gothel's white skill.

Mother Gothel is also featured in Disney Dreamlight Valley

Short film

Tangled Ever After is a short sequel released in 2012. The plot revolves around the wedding of Rapunzel and Eugene. Pascal and Maximus lose the wedding rings and chase after them, causing massive collateral damage along the way.

Musical
An abridged stage adaptation titled Tangled: The Musical premiered on board the Disney Magic of the Disney Cruise Line in November 2015, featuring three new songs written by Alan Menken and Glenn Slater.

Future

Possible sequel
In December 2014, Tangleds producer, Roy Conli, revealed that the production team had been "heavily pushed" for a feature-length sequel to the film, but when the writers and directors got together to develop one, they realized, "she cut her hair. It's over!" Conli explained that at Disney Animation under Lasseter, it is always the filmmakers who decide whether they are ready to make a sequel (not marketing or merchandising). In January 2015, Conli again provided a similar explanation when pressed on this point, and also mentioned that directors Greno and Howard ultimately "weren't really interested" in continuing the story.

In May 2020, Hannah Shaw-Williams of Screen Rant asked whether the success of the movie would lead to a sequel (apart from the short film Tangled Ever After), stating there is no word of it being in active development, noted that Disney is "developing a live-action movie about Rapunzel," and stated that it would take several years for a possible movie to reach theaters.

Television series

Tangled: Before Ever After, a television movie set between the feature film and the short film Tangled Ever After, aired on March 10, 2017, serving as an introduction to a continuing television series, Tangled: The Series, later renamed Rapunzel's Tangled Adventure, that started airing on Disney Channel on March 24, 2017. It ran for three seasons and sixty episodes until March 2020.

Notes

References

External links

 
 
 
 
 
 
 

2010 films
2010 3D films
2010 computer-animated films
2010s American animated films
2010s children's animated films
2010s English-language films
2010s musical films
American children's animated adventure films
American children's animated musical films
American computer-animated films
American animated feature films
Tangled (franchise)
Films adapted into television shows
Films based on Rapunzel
Films about princesses
Films about theft
Films set in Europe
Films set in a fictional country
IMAX films
Walt Disney Animation Studios films
Walt Disney Pictures animated films
Films directed by Byron Howard
Films directed by Nathan Greno
Films scored by Alan Menken
Films with screenplays by Dan Fogelman
3D animated films
2010 directorial debut films
Resurrection in film
Disney Princess films
Films about child abduction